Rhynchodes is a genus of beetles belonging to the family Curculionidae. They are restricted to New Zealand and New Caledonia.

List of species
There are ten species:
  Rhynchodes alboguttatus
 Rhynchode ater
 Rhynchodes eloini
 Rhynchodes falleni
 Rhynchodes jekeli
 Rhynchodes rubipunctatus
 Rhynchodes saundersii
 Rhynchodes squameus
 Rhynchodes ursus
 Rhynchodes weberi

Sources

Cryptorhynchinae
Curculionidae genera
Beetles of New Zealand
Taxa named by Adam White (zoologist)